Blesse may refer to:

 De Blesse, a village in Friesland, Netherlands
 Frederick C. Blesse (1921-2012), United States Air Force major general and flying ace

See also
 Bless (disambiguation)